This article contains a list of cooling bath mixtures.

Table

References

 
 
 

Cooling
baths
Baths